Anders Johan Lexell was a Russian astronomer and mathematician.

Lexell may also refer to:

 Jan Lexell, a Swedish physician and academic.
 2004 Lexell, a main belt asteroid
 D/1770 L1 (Lexell), lost short-periodic comet
 Lexell (crater), a 2.2 km-deep lunar crater